was a samurai commander and member of the powerful Minamoto clan. Along with his brother Yorimitsu, Yorinobu served the regents of the Fujiwara clan, taking the violent measures the Fujiwara were themselves unable to take. He held the title, passed down from his father, of Chinjufu-shōgun, Commander-in-chief of the Defense of the North. He served as Governor of Ise, Shinano, Sagami, Mutsu and Kai Provinces, and was the progenitor of the Kawachi Genji. He was also the predecessor of Takeda ryu.

Biography 
Yorinobu was born on December 21, 988, the son of Minamoto no Mitsunaka (912–997).

Yorinobu is particularly known for being a favorite of the Regent Fujiwara no Michinaga, and for suppressing a revolt by Taira no Tadatsune, vice-governor of Kazusa Province. He had originally refused, for personal reasons, but eventually assented to taking on the charge of defeating Tadatsune, after being made Governor of Kai. While making preparations to attack, Tadatsune surrendered, offering no resistance in 1031. In putting an end to this rebellion, Yorinobu not only furthered the Court's goals and his own reputation, but he created an opening for Minamoto influence in the eastern portions of the country.

The story of the capture of Tadatsune while Yorinobu was the Governor of Kai, and other stories while he was the governor of Kōzuke Province and Hitachi Province, appear in the Konjaku Monogatarishū (vol. 25, sec. 9 and 11).

His Dharma name was Renshin (蓮心). He died on June 1, 1048.

Family
 Father: Chinjufu-shōgun Minamoto no Mitsunaka
 Mother: daughter of Fujiwara no Munetada
 Wife: Shuri no Myobu
 Children: Minamoto no Yoriyoshi

See also 
 Minamoto no Yoriyoshi
 Minamoto no Yoshiie
 Seiwa Genji
 Iwashimizu Hachimangū
 Hachiman

References

Sansom, George (1958). 'A History of Japan to 1334'. Stanford, California: Stanford University Press.

968 births
1048 deaths
Minamoto clan
People of Heian-period Japan
Heian period Buddhists
Deified Japanese people